Jan Košťálek (born 17 February 1995) is a Czech professional ice hockey defenceman. He is currently playing with HC Dynamo Pardubice of the Czech Extraliga (ELH). Košťálek was selected by the Winnipeg Jets in the 4th round (114th overall) of the 2013 NHL Entry Draft.

Playing career

Amateur
Košťálek made his Czech Extraliga debut playing with HC Sparta Praha during the 2011–12 Czech Extraliga season. In 2014–15, Košťálek was instrumental in leading Rimouski to the 2015 Memorial Cup, as the team defeated the Quebec Remparts in seven games, to win the QMJHL Championship.  Košťálek was awarded the Kevin Lowe Trophy, for being chosen the best defensive defenseman in the QMJHL. Kostalek was also awarded the Emile Bouchard Trophy, being named defenseman of the year.

Professional
During his third North American junior season with Rimouski in 2014–15, Košťálek was signed to a three-year entry-level contract with the Winnipeg Jets on 19 March 2015.  On 9 October, Kostalek made his North American professional ice hockey debut, with the Manitoba Moose.

Unable to make progress within the Winnipeg Jets organization during his entry-level contract, Košťálek as a restricted free agent opted to return to his native Czech Republic, rejoining former club HC Sparta Praha of the Extraliga on July 2, 2018.

Career statistics

Regular season and playoffs

International

Awards and honours

References

External links

1995 births
Living people
Czech ice hockey defencemen
HC Dynamo Pardubice players
Jacksonville Icemen players
Manitoba Moose players
Rimouski Océanic players
HC Sparta Praha players
Winnipeg Jets draft picks
Ice hockey people from Prague
Czech expatriate ice hockey players in Canada
Czech expatriate ice hockey players in the United States